Myxomycota and Myxomycetes are terms used to refer to some fungus-like amoebozoa:

 Infraphylum Mycetozoa (which encompasses Myxogastria among other classes)
 Class Myxogastria alone

See also
Wikispecies:Fungi (classifications)